The Arab Chess Championship is an annual international chess competition organized by the Arab Chess Federation, with 18 member countries. Parallel Men's and Women's competitions have been held in various cities since 1983.

Winners

Related pages
Arab Chess Federation

Notes

References
 Winners of the 1984 edition 
 Results 1999 from arabicnews.com 
 Results 2001 from tunishebdo.com  
 Homepage of the 2002 edition: 
 Hichem Hamdouchi biography 
 Lebanese chess history 
 Biography of Mohammed Al-Modaihki 
 Results from The Week in Chess: 2000, 2002, 2003, 2004, 2005
 Results from Chess-Results.com: 2006, 2014 Men, 2014 Women, 2015 Men, 2015 Women

Supranational chess championships
Women's chess competitions
Chess Champ
Chess in Asia